Debashis Chatterjee is an Indian management professor, author, and columnist.. He is the director of Indian Institute of Management Kozhikode. Chatterjee served as the director of the institute for two term. His first tenure was from 2009 to 2014. He returned again to the post in 2018.

He was awarded the Fulbright Fellowship twice: once for pre-doctoral (1994-1995) and a second time for post-doctoral(2000-2001) work at the Kennedy School of Government at Harvard University

Published works 
Debashis Chatterjee authored the following works:

References 

Year of birth missing (living people)
Living people
Indian academic administrators
Indian Institutes of Management